Callionymus beniteguri, the white-spotted dragonet, is a species of dragonet native to the water around Japan and the East China Sea.  This species grows to a length of  SL.  This species is of importance to local commercial fisheries.

References 

B
Fish described in 1900
Taxa named by David Starr Jordan